Sir Robert F. Marx (December 8, 1936 – July 4, 2019) was an American pioneer in scuba diving, a prolific author, and was best known for his work with marine archeology. Over his career, he discovered over 5000 shipwrecks in over 60 countries. Although some accused him of treasure hunting, fellow archeologist E. Lee Spence described Marx as the "true father of underwater archaeology". Marx also helped write UNESCO legislation regarding shipwrecks.

Early life

Marx was born on December 8, 1936, in Pittsburgh, Pennsylvania to a single mother. As a boy, Marx was fascinated with history and exploration and spent most of his time at school and public libraries reading books and magazines such as National Geographic. At the age of 8 after refusing to go to summer camp, Marx ran away to his uncle, who owned a pool hall. For a while, Marx worked as a bookie, collecting bets from patrons. But one patron was a plainclothes cop, and Marx ended up in Juvenile Court detention.

In the fourth grade, he was kicked out of his geography class for correcting the teacher too often. After first using swim goggles while staying with relatives on Lake St. Clair, Marx began to experiment with homemade diving devices at home in Pittsburgh. He almost died using a World War II gas-mask that was modified per instructions in a Popular Science Magazine. He returned to using goggles while retrieving lost fishing tackle and anchors in nearby lakes. At the age of 13, Marx ran away to Atlantic City, New Jersey, which was the first time he ever saw the ocean. While living under the boardwalk, Marx befriended a Polish-American helmet diver who took him in, where Marx spent over a year cleaning the bottom of boats. As juvenile authorities approached, Marx was sent to work with the man's cousin (also a helmet diver) on Long Island Sound, where Marx helped recover crashed Sikorski helicopters.

Marx then traveled to Hollywood, California, where his aunt, who owned an apartment complex, lived. He co-founded the Neptunes, the second freediving club in the US. Marx began spearing fish for food and money. On one occasion, while using a plexiglass camera case he had built to capture images of seals, he was nearly attacked by a pod of orcas. It was in California that Marx discovered his first shipwreck, the SS Winfield Scott, from which he salvaged several gold coins.

Career

Marine Corps
In 1953, at the age of 17, Marx joined the United States Marine Corps where he served as a Staff Sergeant in combat in Korea. He then became a diving specialist. Due to his natural talent, he later became the Director of the USMC Diving School, Vieques, Puerto Rico. During his final year in the Marines, Marx went on two six-week cruises in the Mediterranean, where he salvaged Roman, Greek, and Phoenician ships. While diving in the Bay of Cádiz, Marx's ship left port, leaving him stranded in Spain without identification. After notifying the US Embassy, he spent three days with a history professor at the University of Seville and the owner of the largest wine-bodega in Jerez, who was also a historian. Marx later remarked that he "learned more about history and archaeology from them than [he] might have in four years of college."

Discoveries

He went on to make over 5,000 dives and authored over 800 reports and articles and 59 books on history, archaeology, shipwrecks and exploration. He was a founding member of the Council on Underwater Archaeology and of the Sea Research Society and served on the Society's Board of Advisors. Marx claimed to have discovered the USS Monitor. In 1972 he participated in the creation of the research/professional degree of Doctor of Marine Histories. In 1972, Marx discovered and salvaged the Spanish galleon Nuestra Señora de las Maravillas, which wrecked off the coast of Grand Bahama in 1656. His expedition later became the subject of the network television documentary Treasure Galleon narrated by Rod Serling.

Alleged discovery of Roman amphorae 

Also when Marx went to Brazil in 1982 when he attempted to prove that Roman amphorae  had been brought there by ship.  In 1985 Marx claimed that the Brazilian government covered up the amphorae, an allegation the government denied. A businessman named Americo Santarelli said that he had 16 amphora replicas made which he dropped in the bay to age them but had only recovered four. A year before this dispute the government charged Marx of contraband backing this claim with a catalogue of a 1983 Amsterdam auction where gold coins and other artefacts were offered for sale by Marx and his associates that had not been declared by Marx despite an agreement to do so. Several attempts to let Marx respond to this allegation were rebuffed.

Recreated voyages

In 1962, Marx organized and led a re-enactment of Christopher Columbus' voyage from the Canary Islands to San Salvador Island in an exact replica of his ship La Niña, donned the Niña II. After 3 months, they arrived in the Bahamas on Christmas Eve. According to Marx, "It’s likely the closest modern sailors had come to experiencing the conditions, the determination, and the incredible amount of luck that was needed to cross an ocean 500 years ago." As a result of his endeavor, Marx was made a Knight-commander in the Order of Isabella the Catholic by the Spanish government. In 1964 and 1969 he was the organizer and captain of two voyages of replica Viking ships from Europe to the Americas. He sought to demonstrate the possibility of pre-Columbian transatlantic contact.

Following his trip, Kittinger appeared as himself on the January 14, 1963 episode of the game show To Tell the Truth. He received three of four possible votes.

Writings
Marx authored 59 books and over 900 articles. He was also the Adventure Editor of the Saturday Evening Post, Archaeology Editor of Argosy magazine, as well as a consultant for television and film. He appeared in the documentary television series History's Mysteries. He also produced 55 television documentary films and has worked or appeared in more than a hundred more. Marx also helped write UNESCO legislation regarding shipwrecks, as he had interacted with local governments throughout his career in order to gain access to wrecks. Marx was also a member of the Explorer's Club.

White gods 
Marx wrote extensively about the concept of White gods. Marx came to the conclusion that White Gods "figure in almost every indigenous culture in the Americas." A review by Jonathan Kirsch in the Los Angeles Times concluded that "Quest" was a good yarn, but Marx tried hard to dress it up as something slightly scandalous. In that sense, "Quest" was the archeological equivalent of Oliver Stone's JFK—Marx seeks to prove the existence of "great white gods" by offering us a haphazard collection of oddities, rumors and coincidences, but what's on display here is really nothing more than the passions and obsessions of a born showman."

Marx argued that the Vikings created the Mayan civilisation, arguing that "Their kingdom was founded by a great eastern ruler named Votan. Votan was a white man who with his crew of tall, fair-haired, blue eyed men in dragon-prowed "serpent ships" brought the Mayan people across the sea and settled them in their new land." The problem is that the Popul Vuh has no mention of a Votan. This claim originates in the mistaken translations by Diego de Landa who thought that Mayan glyphs were letters corresponding to the Roman alphabet.

Personal life
Marx met his wife, Jenifer, during the excavation of Port Royal in the 1960s. In later life, they lived in Indialantic, Florida with their three daughters. Together, they co-authored over 30 non-fiction books.

Death
Marx died on July 4, 2019, at the age of 82.

Bibliography
 They Found Treasure: [interviews] by Robert Forrest Burgess (New York : Dodd, Mead, ©1977) , OCLC 2797871
 Always Another Adventure, by Robert F Marx (Cleveland, World Pub. Co., 1967) OCLC 1355136
 Shipwrecks of the Virgin Islands, 1523-1825 by Robert F Marx;  Edward L Towle and the Caribbean Research Institute (St. Thomas, V.I., Caribbean Research Institute, 1969) OCLC: 209714
 The Battle of the Spanish Armada 1588 by Robert F Marx (Cleveland, World Pub. Co., ©1965) OCLC 920618
 Still More Adventures by Robert F Marx (Mason/Charter, 1976)  OCLC 2332224
 Sea Fever by Robert F Marx (Garden City, N.Y., Doubleday, 1972) OCLC 393700
 The Underwater Dig: an introduction to marine archaeology by Robert F Marx (New York : H.Z. Walck, 1975) , OCLC: 1504496
 Shipwrecks of the Western Hemisphere, 1492-1825 by Robert F Marx (New York, World Pub. Co., 1971) OCLC 207459
 The Lure of Sunken Treasure: under the sea with marine archaeologists and treasure hunters by Robert F Marx (New York, McKay, 1973) OCLC 714464
 Encyclopedia of Western Atlantic Shipwrecks and Sunken Treasure by Victoria Sandz and Robert F Marx (Jefferson, N.C.: McFarland, ©2001) , OCLC 46836931
 The World's Richest Shipwrecks by Robert F Marx and Jenifer Marx (Toronto: Key Porter Books, 2005) , OCLC 60369569
 Treasures from the Sea: Exploring the world's great shipwrecks by Robert F Marx and Jenifer Marx (Toronto: Key Porter Books, 2003) , [ OCLC 52039638]
 The treasure fleets of the Spanish Main by Robert F Marx (Cleveland, World Pub. Co., 1968) OCLC 448399
 The Battle of Lepanto, 1571 by Robert F Marx (Cleveland, World Pub. Co., 1966) OCLC 1349558
 They Dared the Deep; a history of diving by Robert F Marx (Cleveland, World Pub. Co., 1967) OCLC 1354152
 Following Columbus; the voyage of the Nina II by Robert F Marx (Cleveland, World Pub. Co., ©1964) OCLC: 1413847
 Buried treasures you can find : over 7500 locations in all 50 states by Robert F Marx (Dallas, TX : Ram Books, ©1993), OCLC: 29561608
 Shipwrecks in Florida Waters : a billion dollar graveyard by Robert F Marx (Chuluota, Fla.: Mickler House, 1985, ©1979) , OCLC 13651406
 The History of Underwater Exploration by Robert F Marx (New York : Dover Publications, 1990) , OCLC 21563447
 In the Wake of Galleons by Robert F Marx (Flagstaff, AZ: Best Pub. Co., ©2001) , OCLC 49311568
 Clay smoking pipes recovered from the sunken city of Port Royal October 1, 1967 – March 31, 1968 by Robert F Marx;  Jamaica National Trust Commission (Kingston, Jamaica National Trust Commission, 1968) OCLC 121031

See alsoNiña II''

References

External links
 Seven Seas Search and Salvage, LLC (as Consultant)
 Sea Research Society (non-profit, educational research foundation)
 Find Marx's books & maps in a library with WorldCat
 New York Times Article

1933 births
2019 deaths
21st-century American historians
21st-century American male writers
American underwater divers
Order of Isabella the Catholic
Place of birth missing
Treasure hunters
Underwater archaeologists
United States Marines
People from Indialantic, Florida
Professional divers
Maritime archaeology
Recipients of the Order of Isabella the Catholic
People from Pittsburgh
American archaeologists
American non-fiction writers
Historians from Florida
American male non-fiction writers